Manhasset is a hamlet in Nassau County, New York.

Manhasset may also refer to:
Manhasset Bay, a bay of Long Island
Manhasset Secondary School
Manhasset Specialty Company, a manufacturer of music stands

See also
Manhasset negotiations, diplomatic talks between Morocco and the Saharawi liberation movement
Manhasset Stable, a thoroughbred horse-racing stable, now defunct